S97 may refer to:
 Anderson Field (Washington), in Okanogan County, Washington, United States
 GCIRS 16SW, a star
 S97 Luoyang-Lushi Expressway, China
 , formerly SAS Maria van Riebeeck, a submarine of the South African Navy
 Sikorsky S-97 Raider, an American helicopter prototype
 S97, a non-geographic postcode in Sheffield, England